Fashkecheh (also Romanized as Fashkacheh and Feshkacheh; Fashkecheh is a village in Balasbaneh Rural District, Kuchesfahan District, Rasht County, Gilan Province, Iran. At the 2006 census, its population was 524, in 122 families.

References 

Populated places in Rasht County